A by-election was held for the Australian House of Representatives seat of Fawkner on 17 August 1935. This was triggered by the death of United Australia Party (UAP) MP George Maxwell.

The by-election was won by UAP candidate and future Prime Minister Harold Holt.

Results

References

1935 elections in Australia
Victorian federal by-elections
1930s in Victoria (Australia)